Katie Rose Miller (née Waldman; born 1991/1992) is an American political advisor who served as the communications director for the Vice President of the United States Mike Pence from 2020 to 2021. She was previously his press secretary from 2019 to 2020.

Early life and education
Waldman was born in Fort Lauderdale, Florida. She is the daughter of attorney Glenn Waldman and Sheryl Waldman (née Bekoff).
She attended Cypress Bay High School in Weston, Florida, graduating in 2010.

Waldman received her BA from the University of Florida, where she was active in the student government's Unite Party. In 2012, she was involved in a scandal when she was caught destroying hundreds of copies of the school's newspaper, after it endorsed an opposing student government candidate. Waldman attended George Washington University, where she earned a Master of Public Policy.

Career 
Waldman worked as a press assistant for the National Republican Senatorial Committee in 2014, and then as press secretary for Senator Steve Daines, beginning in January 2015, and served as a spokeswoman for Senator Martha McSally, then joined the staff as deputy press secretary for the United States Department of Homeland Security during the tenure of Secretary Kirstjen Nielsen from November 2017 to February 2019. During 2019, she was communications director for Arizona Senator Martha McSally, and later became the press secretary to Vice President Mike Pence on October 1, 2019.

Personal life 
Waldman married Stephen Miller, Senior Advisor to the President, on February 16, 2020, at Trump Hotel, only 5 blocks from the White House in Washington, D. C., with President Trump in attendance. The two were dating when she was appointed to the vice president's office. Miller is a Conservative Jew. Rabbi Aryeh Lightstone officiated at the ceremony.

On May 8, 2020, President Donald Trump announced that Miller had tested positive for COVID-19. The President said she had not come into contact with him, but she was in contact with Vice President Mike Pence. Later, she announced she recovered from COVID-19, and was pregnant. During her pregnancy, both she, in May, and her husband, in October, tested positive for COVID-19.

On November 19, 2020, Miller gave birth to their daughter, Mackenzie Jay Miller.

Notes

References

Mike Pence
University of Florida alumni
Living people
American Conservative Jews
American press secretaries
George Washington University alumni
1990s births
People from Fort Lauderdale, Florida
Florida Republicans